Saint-Simon or Saint Simon can refer to:

Places

Canada

Saint-Simon, New Brunswick, a settlement in Gloucester County, New Brunswick
Saint-Simon, Quebec, a municipality in southwestern Quebec on the Yamaska River in Les Maskoutains Regional County Municipality
Saint-Simon-les-Mines, Quebec, a municipality in the Municipalité régionale de comté de Beauce-Sartigan in Quebec, Canada
 Saint-Simon-de-Rimouski, Quebec, a parish municipality in the Les Basques Regional County Municipality in the Bas-Saint-Laurent region of Quebec

France
Saint-Simon, Aisne, in the Aisne département
Saint-Simon, Cantal, in the Cantal département
Saint-Simon, Charente, in the Charente département
Saint-Simon, Lot, in the Lot département
Saint-Simon-de-Bordes, in the Charente-Maritime département
Saint-Simon-de-Pellouaille, in the Charente-Maritime département

United States
St. Simons, Georgia

Organizations
Saint-Simon Foundation, a defunct French think tank

People
Simon the Zealot, one of the apostles of Jesus, canonized
Simon the Athonite, or Simon the Myrrhbearer, founder of Simonopetra, the monastery of Mount Athos, canonized
Simon of Cyrene, the man who carried the cross of Jesus as Jesus was taken to his crucifixion, canonized
Louis de Rouvroy, duc de Saint-Simon, courtier in the court of Louis XIV and writer of memoirs thereof
Claude Henri de Rouvroy, comte de Saint-Simon, utopian socialist and originator of Saint-Simonism
San Simón, a Latin American folk saint
Simon the Tanner, after whom the cave church in Egypt is named

See also
St. Simon (horse), a racehorse
Saint-Simonism, an early socialist philosophy
Saint Simeon (disambiguation)
Simon of Trent, canonized 1575 (approximate)
The Shins' album Chutes Too Narrow, which contains the song "Saint Simon"